Fred Jesse Russell (1916 – January 9, 2007) was an American businessman and diplomat. He served as the United States Ambassador to Denmark under President Richard Nixon. In 1970, Russell was named Under Secretary for the Department of the Interior and replaced Russell E. Train. He was first named deputy director of the Office of Emergency Preparedness after his help in the 1968 Presidential Election.

References

1916 births
2007 deaths
Ambassadors of the United States to Denmark
United States Department of the Interior officials